The Government of San Diego County is defined and authorized under the California Constitution, California law, and the Charter of the County of San Diego. Much of the Government of California is in practice the responsibility of county governments such as the Government of San Diego County. The County government provides countywide services such as elections and voter registration, law enforcement, jails, vital records, property records, tax collection, public health, and social services. In addition the County serves as the local government for all unincorporated areas.

The county government is composed of the elected five-member Board of Supervisors, several other elected offices and officers including the Sheriff, the District Attorney, Assessor/Recorder/County Clerk, and Treasurer/Tax Collector, and numerous county departments and entities under the supervision of the Chief Administrative Officer such as the Probation Department.

Some chartered municipalities such as the city of San Diego and the city of Chula Vista provide their own law enforcement, public safety, libraries, parks and recreation, zoning, and similar services. Other incorporated cities have some or all of these services provided by the County under a contract arrangement. In addition, several entities of the government of California have jurisdiction conterminous with San Diego County, such as the San Diego Superior Court.

The county motto is "The noblest motive is the public good." County government offices are housed in the historic County Administration Center building, constructed from 1935 to 1938 with funding from the Works Progress Administration.

Organization

Board of Supervisors

Elected officers 
In addition to the Board of Supervisors, there are several elected officers that form the Government of San Diego County that are required by the California Constitution and California law, and authorized under the Charter.

The San Diego County Sheriff's Department provides general-service law enforcement to unincorporated areas of the county, serving as the equivalent of the county police for unincorporated areas of the county, and as incorporated cities within the county which have contracted with the agency for law-enforcement services (known as "contract cities"). The Sheriff's Department is also responsible for the county jails, courthouses, and specialized countywide services such as search and rescue, SWAT, etc.

The San Diego County District Attorney prosecutes felony and misdemeanor crimes that occur within the jurisdiction of San Diego County.

The San Diego County Assessor/Recorder/County Clerk is also an elected officer. As county assessor, they are responsible for real estate appraisals for tax purposes (assessments), as county recorder they are responsible for accepting and recording legal instruments such as birth, marriage and death records, and as county clerk they are responsible for issuing marriage licenses and performing civil marriage ceremonies, and registering fictitious business name statements, notaries public, process servers and professional photocopiers.

The San Diego County Board of Education is composed of five members elected from trustee areas. It maintains the policies for governance of the San Diego County Office of Education (SDCOE) and appoints the San Diego County Superintendent of Schools.

Other agencies 
The Chief Administrative Officer assists the Board of Supervisors in handling the mounting administrative details of the County and is responsible for making recommendations to the Board.

The San Diego County Library is the county library.

The Probation Department is responsible for supervising convicted offenders in the community, either who are on probation, such as at the conclusion of their sentences, or while on community supervision orders.

The Health and Human Services Agency (HHSA) provides health and social services such as those county-administered programs related to welfare in California, such as Medi-Cal (Medicaid), CalFresh (food stamps), CalWORKs, and the Low Income Health Program (Obamacare).

The Department of Housing and Community Development (HCD) is the public housing authority through the Housing Authority of the County of San Diego (HACSD).

The Department of Public Works is responsible for county-maintained roads, traffic engineering, land development civil engineering review, design engineering and construction management, land surveying and map processing, cartographic services, watershed quality and flood protection, county airports, solid waste planning and diversion, inactive landfills, and wastewater systems management.

The County Parks and Recreation Department manages local and regional parks, campgrounds, 300 miles of trails, fishing lakes, state-of-the-art recreation centers and sports complexes, ecological preserves, and open space preserves.

The San Diego County Office of Education (SDCOE) is the county education department, and is operated by the San Diego County Superintendent of Schools, pursuant to the policies of the San Diego County Board of Education.

The San Diego County Public Defender provides indigent legal defense services.

Law 

The San Diego County Code is the overarching codification of the local ordinances of the county passed by the Board of Supervisors, of which include the Administrative Code and the Code of Regulatory Ordinances. The San Diego County Administrative Code and the San Diego County Code of Regulatory Ordinances "establishes the duties, rules, regulations and systems of management of the various offices, departments and institutions of the County of San Diego" passed by the Board of Supervisors. Every act prohibited or declared unlawful, and every failure to perform an act required, by the ordinances are misdemeanor crimes, unless otherwise specified as infractions.

Budget 
The adopted budgets for both fiscal year 2011-2012 and 2012-2013 were approximately $4.8 billion.

Other governments 
The San Diego Association of Governments (SANDAG) is an association of local San Diego County governments.
The San Diego Local Agency Formstion Commission (LAFCO) is subdivision of the State and regulates and plans local agency boundaries and service areas. LAFCO comprises 13 appointed elected officials including three members of the Board of Supervisors.

California 

In the State Assembly, the 76th, 77th, 78th, 79th, and 80th districts are entirely within the county and parts of the 71st and 75th districts are within the county. In the State Senate, all of the 39th district and parts of the 36th, 38th and 40th districts are within the county.

San Diego County is represented by the Third District in the State Board of Equalization.

The San Diego Superior Court, which covers the entire county, is not a County department but a division of the State's trial court system. Historically, the courthouses were county-owned buildings that were maintained at county expense, which created significant friction since the trial court judges, as officials of the state government, had to lobby the county Board of Supervisors for facility renovations and upgrades. In turn, the state judiciary successfully persuaded the state Legislature to authorize the transfer of all courthouses to the state government in 2008 and 2009 (so that judges would have direct control over their own courthouses). Courthouse security is still provided by the county government under a contract with the state.

The Richard J. Donovan Correctional Facility of the California Department of Corrections and Rehabilitation is in an unincorporated area in the county.

San Diego 

The government of San Diego consists principally of a mayor and a nine-member city council. In 2006, the city's form of government changed from a "city manager system" to a "strong mayor system". The change was brought about by a citywide vote in 2004. The mayor is in effect the chief executive officer of the city, while the council is the legislative body.

The members of the city council are each elected from single member districts within the city. The mayor and city attorney are elected directly by the voters of the entire city. The mayor, city attorney, and council members are elected to four-year terms, with a two-term limit. Elections are held on a non-partisan basis per California state law; nevertheless, most officeholders do identify themselves as either Democrats or Republicans.

In 2015, registered Democrats outnumbered Republicans by about 39% to 26% the city, and Democrats currently hold an 8-1 majority in the City Council.

School districts

Special districts 
The San Diego Local Agency Formation Commission (SDLAFCo) is the Local Agency Formation Commission (LAFCo) for San Diego County and regulates special districts within its jurisdiction.

The San Diego Metropolitan Transit System (MTS or SDMTS) is the public transit provider for Central, South, Northeast and Southeast San Diego County and is governed by a fifteen-member Board of Directors chosen by its constituent joint powers authority city councils and the Board of Supervisors. The North County Transit District (NCTD) is the public transit provider for North San Diego County and is governed by a twelve-member Board of Directors composed of one representative from each incorporated city in the District plus the fifth district county supervisor.

The Beach Cities Health District and Palomar Health are examples of public health districts in San Diego County. Areas of the city immediately adjacent to San Diego Bay ("tidelands") are under the jurisdiction of the Port of San Diego.

Political parties 
Per California state law, each political party recognized by the State of California has the right to form a central committee in each county; the central committee functions as a unit of the state political party. The composition of the central committee is determined by the bylaws of each county party as allowed by state law.

Major party central committees include the San Diego County Democratic Party Central Committee and the Republican Party of San Diego County Central Committee. Other party organizations include the San Diego Libertarian Party, the San Diego County Peace and Freedom Party, and the Green Party of San Diego County.

For the San Diego County Democratic Party Central Committee and the Republican Party of San Diego County Central Committee, six elected members from each California State Assembly district contained within San Diego County are chosen by registered party voters during the primary election in even-numbered years. If the number of candidates nominated for election does not exceed the number of candidates to be elected, the candidates are not listed on the ballots, but are instead declared elected by the Board of Supervisors. Democratic central committee members may include party officials, elected officials, recent candidates, appointed members, and elected members. The Republican central committee consists of the elected members, plus appointed members and Republican elected office holders as ex-officio members, not to exceed a total of 75 members.

Notes

External links 
 San Diego County official website
 San Diego County Administrative Code and San Diego County Regulatory Code from American Legal Publishing

 
San Diego